Chandra Nihal Jayasinghe is a Sri Lankan judge and a member of the Khmer Rouge Tribunal. He is the Sri Lanka High Commissioner to the United Kingdom and was formerly a senior presiding judge of the Supreme Court of Sri Lanka and president of the Court of Appeal of Sri Lanka.

References 

Living people
Year of birth missing (living people)
Sri Lankan judges of international courts and tribunals
Sri Lankan diplomats
Khmer Rouge Tribunal judges
Puisne Justices of the Supreme Court of Sri Lanka
Presidents of the Court of Appeal of Sri Lanka
Court of Appeal of Sri Lanka judges
Sinhalese judges
Sinhalese lawyers
20th-century Sri Lankan people
21st-century Sri Lankan people
High Commissioners of Sri Lanka to the United Kingdom